St. Isidore Island is the ice-covered island 1.65 km long in southwest–northeast direction and 890 m wide in the Barcroft group of Biscoe Islands.  Its surface area is 60.3 ha.

The feature is named after St. Isidore of Seville (c. 560–636), the unofficial patron saint of internet and computer users, programmers and technicians.

Location
British mapping in 1976.

Maps
 British Antarctic Territory. Scale 1:200000 topographic map. DOS 610 Series, Sheet W 66 66. Directorate of Overseas Surveys, UK, 1976
 Antarctic Digital Database (ADD). Scale 1:250000 topographic map of Antarctica. Scientific Committee on Antarctic Research (SCAR). Since 1993, regularly upgraded and updated

See also
 List of Antarctic and subantarctic islands

Notes

References
 St. Isidore Island. SCAR Composite Gazetteer of Antarctica
 Bulgarian Antarctic Gazetteer. Antarctic Place-names Commission. (details in Bulgarian, basic data in English)

External links
 St. Isidore Island. Adjusted Copernix satellite image

Islands of the Biscoe Islands
Bulgaria and the Antarctic